The 2008 Speedway Grand Prix of Europe was the second race of the 2008 Speedway Grand Prix season. It took place on May 10 in the Alfred Smoczyk Stadium in Leszno, Poland. The main sponsor was the commercial bank Bank Zachodni WBK.

The Grand Prind was won by Leigh Adams from Australia. It was the 7th Grand Prix win of his career. In the final, Adams beat American Greg Hancock and defending World Champion Danish Nicki Pedersen.

Riders 

The Speedway Grand Prix Commission nominated Jarosław Hampel as wild card, and Damian Baliński and Krzysztof Buczkowski as track reserves. The draw was made on April 29 at the Fédération Internationale de Motocyclisme Headquarters in Mies, Switzerland. Because of an injury, Bjarne Pedersen was replaced by Luboš Tomíček, Jr. Adams, Kasprzak, Hampel and Baliński are all riding for Unia Leszno, whose home track is at the Alfred Smoczyk Stadium, in the 2008 season in Poland.

 Draw No 1:  (11) Bjarne Pedersen →  (19) Luboš Tomíček, Jr.

Heat details

Heat after heat 
 (60.91) Pedersen, Harris, Dryml, Tomicek
 (60.82) Hancock, Hampel, Lindgren, Crump
 (60.63) Jonsson, Adams, Kasprzak, Andersen
 (59.44) Gollob, Iversen, Nicholls, Holta
 (60.62) Adams, Tomicek, Lindgren, Holta
 (59.94) Jonsson, Crump, Harris, Iversen
 (60.10) Hancock, Pedersen, Nicholls, Kasprzak
 (60.09) Gollob, Hampel, Andersen, Dryml
 (60.47) Gollob, Crump, Kasprzak, Tomicek
 (60.85) Andersen, Harris, Lindgren, Nicholls
 (60.04) Hampel, Iversen, Pedersen, Adams
 (60.25) Hancock, Holta, Jonsson, Dryml
 (60.96) Hancock, Iversen, Andersen, Tomicek
 (60.38) Hampel, Holta, Harris, Kasprzak
 (60.45) Pedersen, Lindgren, Gollob, Jonsson
 (60.19) Adams, Crump, Dryml, Nicholls
 (60.28) Hampel, Jonsson, Tomicek, Nicholls (E4)
 (60.38) Adams, Hancock, Gollob, Harris
 (60.67) Pedersen, Crump, Andersen, Holta
 (61.14) Iversen, Lindgren, Kasprzak, Dryml
 Semi-Finals:
 (60.73) Adams, Hancock, Iversen, Jonsson
 (60.19) Hampel, Pedersen, Gollob, Crump (X) Pedersen crashes on final lap due to collision to Crump. Crump excluded. Heat was no-restarted.
 Final:
 (60.23) Adams (6), Hancock (4), Pedersen (2), Hampel (0)

The intermediate classification

See also 
 Speedway Grand Prix
 List of Speedway Grand Prix riders

References

External links 
 www.SpeedwayWorld.tv

E
2008
Sport in Greater Poland Voivodeship
Leszno
Speedway competitions in Poland